The Cointet-element, also known as a Belgian Gate or C-element, was a heavy steel fence about  wide and  high, typically mounted on concrete rollers, used as a mobile anti-tank obstacle during World War II. Its invention is attributed to a French colonel (later general), Léon-Edmond de Cointet de Fillain who came up with the idea in 1933 to be used in the Maginot Line. Besides their use as barricades to the entrances of forts, bridges and roads, the heavy fences were used in the Belgian "Iron Wall" of the Koningshooikt—Wavre Line (also known as "Dyle Line") and their re-use as beach obstacles on the Atlantic Wall defending Normandy from Allied invasion.

History 

The Cointet-element formed the main barricade of the Belgian K-W Line, a tank barricade that was built between September 1939 and May 1940. Following tests, the Belgian Army accepted the Cointet-elements in 1936 after slightly altering the design by the addition of eight vertical beams in the front frame to stop infantry moving through them. On 13 February 1939 and 24 July 1939 the first tenders were called for ten groups of five hundred Cointets each. A total of 77,000 pieces were ordered by the Belgian Ministry of Defence and produced by twenty-eight Belgian companies with 73,600 pieces delivered.

Thousands of Cointets were installed on the K-W Line between the village of Koningshooikt and the city of Wavre to act as the main line of defence against a possible German armoured invasion through the heartland of Belgium, forming a long iron wall. The Cointet-elements were placed next to each other in a zig-zag and connected with steel cables. Near main roads they were fixed to heavy concrete pillars set into the ground to allow local traffic passage. By May 1940 however, due to a relocation programme, the elements did not form a continuous line and thus were easily bypassed by the 3rd and 4th Panzer Divisions.

The Cointet elements were also used as an anti-tank line in a sidebranch of the K-W Line, which was meant to defend the southern approaches to Brussels. This line branched off the main line in Wavre and ran from there to Halle and on to Ninove, where it ended on the banks of the Dender.

After the German victory in Belgium on 28 May 1940, the Belgian Gates were reallocated across Europe to serve as barricade elements on roads, bridges and beaches. The Germans gave it the name C-element. Large numbers of gates were brought to Normandy during the construction of the Atlantikwall to be used with the other varieties of beach obstacles. Instead of connecting them, the Germans used them singly next to other items, especially at the low tide line. They were also put on the dikes next to bunkers. With many more still present in Belgium after D-Day, the Allies had great difficulty passing them in the last months of the war.

See also 

 Cheval de frise
 Czech hedgehog
 Dragon's teeth

References

External links 

Obstacles on the Normandy battlefields
kwlinie.be – A Belgian inventarisation project of the KW line set up in 2009

Fortification (obstacles)
Anti-tank obstacles
Military history of Belgium during World War II
Maginot Line
Military equipment introduced in the 1930s

Fortification (architectural elements)
Area denial weapons